Victor Charles Carlson (16 July 1893 – 23 February 1974) was an Australian rules footballer who played with East Fremantle in the West Australian Football League (WAFL).

Carlson spent his early childhood in Adelaide and almost died at the age of six following an incident with a train. He had been sitting in a cart beside a shop when the horse became uncontrollable and backed onto railway tracks, just as a train was approaching. The train ran over the cart and Carlson was thrown out upon impact. With only a minor scalp wound, Carlson was later found safe under the train after it had stopped.

Now living in Western Australia, Carlson captained Wentworth, a junior club in Fremantle, before joining Easts. He was a wingman in East Fremantle's 1914 premiership team and also played in their 1918 premiership side, as a centre half back.

He was also a leading district cricketer and represented Western Australia in three first-class matches. Playing as a right handed top order batsman, he could only make 14 runs in his five innings. This included a pair against Victoria at the Fitzroy Cricket Ground, when he opened the batting and was bowled by Bert Ironmonger in each innings.

See also
 List of Western Australia first-class cricketers

References

1893 births
1974 deaths
Australian rules footballers from Western Australia
East Fremantle Football Club players
Australian cricketers
Western Australia cricketers
Cricketers from South Australia